John Strickland (May 20, 1970 — October 6, 2010) was a former professional basketball and streetball player.  He was a native of Washington Heights NYC who left to play college basketball. He later played at Hawaii Pacific University where he averaged a double-double each season.  He went on to play at the USBL for 6 seasons where he averaged 22 points per game. He also played for the Albany Patroons of the CBA. In 2008, he was a CBA All Star.  He died in 2010 at the age of 40.

Media
He was mentioned in the Jay-Z song "Public Service Announcement" with the lyric "No one can do it better. I check cheddar like a food inspector. My homey Strick told me, ‘Dude, finish your breakfast.'” 

As a streetball player, it was alleged that Strickland played in drug money fueled games.

References

1970s births
2010 deaths
Sportspeople from Manhattan
Basketball players from New York City
Columbus Riverdragons players
Fayetteville Patriots players
Hawaii Pacific Sharks men's basketball players
Mobile Revelers players
American expatriate basketball people in the Philippines
Barangay Ginebra San Miguel players
Philippine Basketball Association imports